Red Peppers is a 1962 Australian TV play based on the play Red Peppers. It aired with the play Family Album. Each play went for half an hour. James Upshaw produced.

They were broadcast on Wednesday July 25, 1962 at 8.30 p.m. on ABM 2. Red Peppers a telerecording was short first and the live production Family Album followed. It was the first time Noel Coward had been adapted for Australian television, mostly because "it was hard to get the rights," according to Upshaw.

Cast of Red Peppers
Lorrae Desmond as Lily
Colin Croft as George
Neva Carr Glyn
Murray Foy
Henry Gilbert
Brigid Lenihan
Colin Croft

Cast of Family Album
Lorrae Desmond as Jane Featherways
Colin Croft as Jasper Featherways

Production
It was Desmond's debut in a straight stage production and followed airing of her own variety show, The Lorrae Desmond Show. She had been in the US. Her co star Colin Croft appeared on her variety show.

"It will be wonderful to be on TV again after night club engagements," said Desmond. "I shall be singing in both comedies hut I am enthusiastic about appearing to a straight play."

Reception
The Bulletin called it "worthy   of   the  highest   praise... almost   flawless...a delight   to   watch,   if   only   because   it   was  a   breakthrough   in   local   television   production. "

The Sydney Morning Herald said "Not even Lorrae Desmond, assisted by a fine _supporting cast and an excellent production... can disguise the perennially unsubstantial quality of Noel Coward's dramatic work" pointing out it was "the first appearance of a Coward play on Australian television, and, one hopes, the last."

The Sunday Sydney Morning Herald thought "Of the two plays, I thought "Family Album" came off a shade better, with acting honours going to Brigid Leniban as the spinster daughter, Lavinia."

References

1962 television plays
Australian television plays